Lucius Genucius Aventinensis, along with Quintus Servilius Ahala, was one of the two consuls of ancient Rome in 365 BC.

Genucius was also the consul of 362 BC again with Quintus Servilius Ahala. Genucius was killed in battle between 362 BC and 358 BC during the Roman conquest of the Hernici. He is often confused with the Lucius Genucius who was the tribune of the plebs in 342 BC.

References

5th-century BC Roman consuls
4th-century BC deaths
Year of birth unknown
Year of death uncertain
Aventinensis, Lucius